Lisa Lea Stone (née Anderson; born August 14, 1962) is an American college basketball coach who was previously the head women's basketball coach at Saint Louis University.

Early life and education 
Born Lisa Lea Anderson in Madison, Wisconsin and raised in the nearby town of Oregon, Stone earned lettered in tennis, basketball, and track at Oregon High School. Helping Oregon qualify for the Wisconsin state basketball tournament in both years, Stone earned second-team all-state honors as a junior in 1979 and first-team honors as a senior in 1980.

She played college basketball at the University of Iowa from 1980 to 1984 under future Hall of Famer C. Vivian Stringer. Playing at point guard, Stone had 1,129 points, 332 assists, and 177 steals in her career. She won the 1984 Big Ten Medal of Honor for combined athletic and academic achievement. Stone earned a bachelor's degree in 1984 and a master's degree in athletic administration from Iowa in 1986.

Coaching career

Cornell College (1985–1988)
Stone began her coaching career in 1985 as head coach of Cornell College, a Division III college in Mt. Vernon, Iowa. Entering her job as the youngest four-year coach in the U.S., Stone compiled a 34–32 record in three seasons and led the Rams to three consecutive Southern Division titles in the Midwest Conference.

Wisconsin–Eau Claire (1988–2000)
From 1988 to 2000, Stone was head coach at the University of Wisconsin-Eau Claire. Inheriting a program that had only one winning season in history, Stone compiled a 277–59 (.824) record in 12 seasons at Eau Claire, which ranks second all-time for most wins in the league's history. Her teams had 20-win seasons and NCAA Tournament appearances in every year except 1990–91.

In 1997, Stone led the Blugolds to the NCAA Division III national championship game, losing to New York University. Stone earned five Wisconsin Intercollegiate Athletic Conference Coach of the Year honors (1989, 1990, 1993, 1995, and 2000) and two Division III National Coach of the Year awards, from the Women's Basketball Coaches Association in 1997 and Molten Corporation in 2000.

Drake (2000–2003)
On May 1, 2000, Drake University in Des Moines, Iowa hired Stone as its head women's basketball coach. Drake went 64–27 in Stone's three seasons as head coach with two NCAA Tournament appearances, including a run to the Sweet 16 in 2002, and the 2001 Missouri Valley Conference (MVC) regular season title. Stone was the MVC Coach of the Year in 2001.

Wisconsin (2003–2011)
Returning home to the Madison, Wisconsin area, Stone became head coach at Wisconsin on March 31, 2003. Stone inherited a program that went 7–21 the previous season. Wisconsin went 10–17 in Stone's first season. Reaching a program record number of wins in 2006–07, Wisconsin went 23–13 and made the WNIT championship game. The team featured All-American guard and future WNBA draft pick Jolene Anderson.

After two more WNIT appearances in 2008 and 2009, Wisconsin had another 20-win season in 2009–10, with a 21–11 record and first appearance in the NCAA tournament in Stone's tenure. Stone won Big Ten Coach of the Year honors following the season.

Wisconsin fired Stone on March 21, 2011, following a 16–15 season and WNIT appearance. Stone finished her eight-year tenure with a 128–119 record at Wisconsin. Athletic director Barry Alvarez explained the firing: "On the court...our women’s basketball program has not reached and maintained the level of success I believe is possible."

Saint Louis (2012–2022)
Stone was hired as head women's basketball coach at Saint Louis University on May 4, 2012. Inheriting a program that had nine straight losing seasons, Stone led Saint Louis to a 26–8 record, the program's first Atlantic 10 Conference (A-10) regular season title, and a third round WNIT appearance by her fourth season. That season also had Saint Louis' first-ever All-American player in Jackie Kemph. Stone won A-10 Coach of the Year and College Sports Madness High Major Coach of the Year honors after that season. In 2016–17, Saint Louis had another successful season, with a 25–9 record and second-round WNIT appearance. Her contract was not renewed in 2022.

Personal life 
Stone is married to Ed Stone; they have two children.

Head coaching record
Source for Cornell College:

Sources for Wisconsin–Eau Claire:

Source for Drake:

Source for Wisconsin:

Source for Saint Louis:

References

1962 births
Living people
American women's basketball coaches
American women's basketball players
Basketball coaches from Wisconsin
Drake Bulldogs women's basketball coaches
Iowa Hawkeyes women's basketball players
People from Oregon, Wisconsin
Point guards
Saint Louis Billikens women's basketball coaches
Sportspeople from Madison, Wisconsin
Wisconsin Badgers women's basketball coaches
Wisconsin–Eau Claire Blugolds women's basketball coaches
Cornell Rams basketball